Holland Sheltair Aviation Group is a collective group of companies that provide services to the entire aviation community, but notably the business jet community. Gerald M. Holland founded Holland Builders Inc in 1963, whereas the Sheltair half of the alliance was formed in 1988. The two joined in 2004 to form Holland Sheltair. The majority of the group is located in Florida, with a few other locations in New York and Georgia. 

Sheltair has opened a new 30,000-square-foot hangar at the Savannah/Hilton Head International Airport (SAV) in Dec 2022. This new facility is a multi-million-dollar investment, used to enhance the Sheltair SAV FBO facility services. The hangar will open up additional aircraft storage for the area.

Sheltair & Avfuel: Future Takes Flight Scholarship Program 
This annual scholarship program will provide $30,000 in educational funds and present $5,000 in scholarships to aviators in three different categories. Two will be given for learning to fly or advanced pilot ratings, two for aviation technicians and two for continuing education. Sheltair splits the fund across the different categories to better help the future of business aviation through a broader scope of developmental opportunities. 

“With the Future Takes Flight Scholarship Program, we’re giving back to the industry that has given us everything,” Sheltair’s president Lisa Holland said.

Companies 
 Sheltair Aviation Services - The company that provides the actual services.
 Sheltair Aviation Facilities - The company that provides physical space to perform the services.
 Holland Builders Inc - The company that builds the spaces.

References

External links
 Holland Sheltair

Aircraft ground handling companies